Labyrnavirus is a monotypic genus of viruses in the order Picornavirales. Protist and labyrinthulomycetes serve as natural hosts, notably Aurantiochytrium. There is only one species in this genus: Aurantiochytrium single-stranded RNA virus 01.

Structure
Viruses in Labyrnavirus are non-enveloped, with icosahedral, spherical, and round geometries, and T=pseudo3 symmetry. The diameter is around 25 nm. Genomes are linear and non-segmented, around 9kb in length. The genome has three open reading frames.

Life cycle
Viral replication is cytoplasmic. Entry into the host cell is achieved by attachment of the virus to host receptors, which mediates endocytosis. Replication follows the positive stranded RNA virus replication model. Positive stranded RNA virus transcription is the method of transcription. Protist and labyrinthulomycetes serve as the natural host.

References

External links
 Viralzone: Labyrnavirus
 ICTV

Picornavirales
Virus genera